The 1914–15 PCHA season was the fourth season of the professional men's ice hockey Pacific Coast Hockey Association league. Season play ran from December 8, 1914, until March 9, 1915. The schedule was made for each team to play 18 games, but like the previous three seasons,  one game was cancelled. The Vancouver Millionaires club were the PCHA champions. After the season the club faced off against the Ottawa Senators, NHA champions for the Stanley Cup, winning the series and becoming the first west-coast team to win the Cup.

League business
The franchise of the New Westminster Royals was transferred to Portland, Oregon, and renamed the "Rosebuds." The league established a "farm system" called the Boundary Hockey League in the British Columbia towns of Grand Forks, Greenwood and Phoenix.

Rule changes
The league banned body checking within  of the boards.

Regular season
Rookie Mickey MacKay led the league with 33 goals, while Cyclone Taylor won the scoring title. The two led the Vancouver Millionaires to the league title, winning 13 of 17 games.

Final standings
Note: W = Wins, L = Losses, T = Ties, GF= Goals For, GA = Goals against

Results

a Cancelled

A game between Vancouver and Victoria was cancelled at the end of the season.

Source: Coleman, p. 271

All-Star games
On March 15 and 17 two All-Star games were played in Portland between the league champions Vancouver Millionaires and a PCHA All-Star aggregation made out of players from the Portland Rosebuds and the Victoria Aristocrats. Vancouver won the first game at the Portland Ice Hippodrome 9 goals to 8, with Cyclone Taylor scoring four times for the winning side, and with Lester Patrick having an impressive five goals and three assists for the losing side, figuring in all of the All-Stars goals.

Vancouver managed to win also the second game by a one-goal margin, defeating the All-Stars 4 goals to 3. Frank Nighbor made a good showing for the winning side with two goals, and for the All-Stars Ran McDonald scored twice.

Playoffs

The champion Vancouver Millionaires hosted the finals against the Ottawa Senators, NHA champions. Vancouver won the series and became the first west-coast team to win the Cup.

Player statistics

Goaltending averages

Scoring leaders

Vancouver Millionaires 1915 Stanley Cup champions

See also
List of pre-NHL seasons
1914–15 NHA season
1914 in sports
1915 in sports

References

Notes

Bibliography
 

 
Pacific Coast Hockey Association seasons
PCHA
PCHA